Schriver is a surname. Notable people with the surname include:

Henry Schriver (1914–2011), member of the Ohio House of Representatives
Iver Schriver (born 1949), Danish footballer
Ollie Schriver (1879–1947), American Gunnery Sergeant
Pop Schriver (1865–1932), American baseball player
Ramblin' Lou Schriver (1929–2016), American radio personality
Randall Schriver (born 1967), American federal government official

See also 
Schrijver
Shriver
Schreiber (disambiguation)

Danish-language surnames